Gargamel may refer to:

 Gargamel, the villain of the comic strip and animated TV series The Smurfs 
 Gargamel!, an American rock band
 Gargamel, a reggae artist better known as Buju Banton 
 Gargamelle,  giantess and mother of Gargantua in Gargantua and Pantagruel 
 Gargamelle, a bubble chamber particle detector at CERN, named for the giantess